The Singapore Philatelic Museum (Chinese: 新加坡集邮博物馆;)  was a museum about the postal history of Singapore and its stamps.

Background
The museum, located at 23-B Coleman Street in Singapore, was formerly part of the Anglo-Chinese School,  completed in 1906. In the 1970s, the building became the Methodist Book Room until it was restored to become the present museum. The museum is currently closed for renovations.

Singapore Philatelic Museum opened on 19 August 1995 to promote interest in and the appreciation of Singapore's history and heritage in philately. Besides the permanent galleries, the theme galleries offer a host of changing exhibitions throughout the year. These include displays from the private collections of renowned philatelists, travelling exhibitions from overseas and themed exhibitions to commemorate new stamp issues. The museum has a stamp shop, and is popular with stamp collectors.

There are files where visitors can inspect all of the Republic of Singapore stamps issued.  Also on exhibit is a German forgery of a British postage stamp printed during World War II which intentionally has a printing error which mocks King George VI.

Near the Singapore Philatelic Museum, the recently restored Masonic Club.

On 6 March 2020, it was announced will become a dedicated children’s museum when it reopens in 2021. On 7 December 2021, it was announced that due to delays caused by the COVID-19 pandemic, the reopening was pushed back to December 2022.

See also

List of museums in Singapore
Philately
Stamp collecting
List of philatelic museums

References

Literature

External links
Singapore Philatelic Museum Website
Virtual Tours of the Singapore Philatelic Museum

Museums in Singapore
Museum Planning Area
Philatelic museums
Philately of Malaysia
Philately of Singapore
Museums established in 1995
1995 establishments in Singapore